The women's 1000 m competition in speed skating  at the 2022 Winter Olympics was held on 17 February, at the Beijing National Speed Skating Oval ("Ice Ribbon") in Beijing. Miho Takagi of Japan won the event, becoming the first Japanese Olympic gold medalist in this event, and second Asian gold medalist after Zhang Hong in 2014. It was also her first  Olympic gold medal in an individual event. Jutta Leerdam of the Netherlands won the silver medal, her first Olympic medal. Brittany Bowe of the United States was third, her first individual Olympic medal.

The 2018 champion and the Olympic record holder, Jorien ter Mors, retired from competitions. The silver medalist, Nao Kodaira, and the bronze medalist, Takagi, were both competing. Bowe was the 2021 World Single Distances champion at the 1000 m  distance and also the world record holder at the beginning of the Olympics. Leerdam and Elizaveta Golubeva were the silver and bronze medalists, respectively. Bowe was leading the 2021–22 ISU Speed Skating World Cup at the 1000 m distance with four races completed before the Olympics, followed by Kodaira and Takagi. Takagi skated the season best time, 1:11.83 in Salt Lake City on 4 December 2021.

In pair 3, Antoinette de Jong took the lead with the first time below 1:15. This time was improved only in pair 11, when Jutta Leerdam skated 1:13.83, with four pairs to go. In pair 13, Takagi set the new Olympic record with 1:13.19, and Angelina Golikova had provisionally third time, shifting de Jong off the podium. In the last pair, Bowe skated the third time of the day.

Qualification

A total of 30 entry quotas were available for the event, with a maximum of three athletes per NOC. The first 20 athletes qualified through their performance at the 2021–22 ISU Speed Skating World Cup, while the last ten earned quotas by having the best times among athletes not already qualified. A country could only earn the maximum three spots through the World Cup rankings.

The qualification time for the event (1:18.00) was released on July 1, 2021, and was unchanged from 2018. Skaters had the time period of July 1, 2021 – January 16, 2022 to achieve qualification times at valid International Skating Union (ISU) events.

Records
Prior to this competition, the existing world and Olympic records were as follows.

A new Olympic record was set during the competition.

Results
The races were started at 16:30.

References

Women's speed skating at the 2022 Winter Olympics